Nizhneye Makhargimakhi (Dargwa: Хьар Махӏаргимахьи) is a rural locality (a selo) in Burdekinskoye Rural Settlement, Sergokalinsky District, Republic of Dagestan, Russia. The population was 329 as of 2010. There is 1 street.

Geography
Nizhneye Makhargimakhi is located 19 km south of Sergokala (the district's administrative centre) by road. Urakhi and Burdeki are the nearest rural localities.

Nationalities
Dargins live there.

References

Rural localities in Sergokalinsky District